Royal Léopold Club, also known as Léopold is a Belgian sports club based in Uccle, Brussels. The club is most well known for its field hockey section with both the first men's and women's teams playing in the Belgian Hockey League.

They are the most successful Belgian field hockey club having won 28 league titles. Their biggest European success was in 1975 when they reached the final of the EuroHockey Club Champions Cup. In 2021 they won their first Euro Hockey League medal and became the third Belgian club to do so when they won the bronze medal match against Uhlenhorst Mülheim. The club was founded in 1893 and the field hockey section in 1895.

Honours

Men
Belgian Hockey League
 Winners (28): 1921–22, 1922–23, 1927–28, 1938–39, 1950–51, 1951–52, 1954–55, 1958–59, 1959–60, 1960–61, 1965–66, 1966–67, 1967–68, 1968–69, 1969–70, 1970–71, 1971–72, 1972–73, 1973–74, 1978–79, 1987–88, 1988–89, 1990–91, 1991–92, 2001–02, 2003–04, 2004–05, 2018–19
EuroHockey Club Champions Cup
 Runners-up (1): 1975
EuroHockey Club Trophy
 Winners:  1989
EuroHockey Indoor Cub Challenge II
 Runners-up (1): 2005

Women
Belgian Hockey League
Winners (14): 1921–22, 1922–23, 1925–26, 1929–30, 1935–36, 1936–37, 1949–50, 1950–51, 1991–91, 1994–95, 1999–00, 2000–01, 2003–04, 2004–05

Current squad

Men's squad

Women's squad

References

External links

 
Leopold
Uccle
Sport in Brussels
1893 establishments in Belgium